is a former Japanese football player. She played for Japan national team.

Club career
Yamada was born in Shizuoka on August 2, 1966. She played for her local club Shimizudaihachi SC and Suzuyo Shimizu FC Lovely Ladies.

National team career
On October 17, 1984, when Yamada was 18 years old, she debuted for Japan national team against Italy. She was a member of Japan for 1989 AFC Championship. This competition was her last game for Japan. She played 21 games and scored 3 goals for Japan until 1989.

National team statistics

References

External links
viora.tv

1966 births
Living people
Association football people from Shizuoka Prefecture
Japanese women's footballers
Japan women's international footballers
Nadeshiko League players
Shimizudaihachi Pleiades players
Suzuyo Shimizu FC Lovely Ladies players
Women's association footballers not categorized by position